Elpis, minor planet designation: 59 Elpis, is a large main belt asteroid that orbits the Sun with a period of 4.47 years. It is a C-type asteroid, meaning that it is very dark and carbonaceous in composition. In the Tholen scheme it has a classification of CP, while Bus and Binzen class it as type B.

Elpis was discovered by Jean Chacornac from Paris, on September 12, 1860. It was Chacornac's sixth and final asteroid discovery.

A controversy arose over the naming of Elpis. Urbain Le Verrier, director of the Paris Observatory, at first refused to allow Chacornac to name the object, because Leverrier was promoting a plan to reorganize asteroid nomenclature by naming them after their discoverers, rather than mythological figures. A protest arose among astronomers. At the Vienna Observatory, Edmund Weiss, who had been studying the asteroid, asked the observatory's director, Karl L. Littrow, to name it. Littrow chose Elpis, a Greek personification of hope, in reference to the favorable political conditions in Europe at the time. In 1862, Leverrier permitted Chacornac to choose a name, and he selected "Olympia" at the suggestion of John Russell Hind.  However, Elpis is the name that stuck.

Elpis has been studied by radar.

References

External links 
 
 

Background asteroids
Elpis
Elpis
CP-type asteroids (Tholen)
B-type asteroids (SMASS)
18600912